Sowt Gavaber (also Romanized as Sowt Gavāber and Sootgavaber; also known as Sowt Kavāber and Sudgazer) is a village in Tutaki Rural District, in the Central District of Siahkal County, Gilan Province, Iran. At the 2006 census, its population was 251, in 60 families.

References 

Populated places in Siahkal County